Desmond Chiam is an Australian actor best known for his role as Wyatt Cole on Reef Break, General Riga on The Shannara Chronicles and Dovich on The Falcon and the Winter Soldier.

Early life and education 
Chiam was born to parents of Chinese Singaporean descent. As a child he spent a third of the year in Singapore as his father often worked there. He holds a law degree from the University of Melbourne and also a master's degree in screenwriting from University of Southern California.

Career 
Chiam first pursued a career as a lawyer after he graduated from the University of Melbourne. Unsatisfied with a law career after three months, he decided to pursue more creative fields in breakdancing and acting.

He first started in short films in Australia before eventually appearing in Australian television in series such as Neighbours and Better Man. He eventually moved to Los Angeles to pursue a career in acting. Chiam has had roles in multiple American television series including NCIS: Los Angeles and Bones, and was also in Con Man, a webseries by Alan Tudyk.

In February 2017, he joined the main cast of Spike TV's The Shannara Chronicles (the series was formerly on MTV) in the show's second season where he played the villain, General Riga.  Following the Shannara Chronicles, he was cast as Jethro, boyfriend to Carly played by Kelli Berglund, in the Starz series Now Apocalypse starring Avan Jogia by Gregg Araki. Following the series, he joined the cast of the Manila-set film Empty by Design working alongside friends Chris Pang, Osric Chau, Yoshi Sudarso, and Andrea Walter.

In December 2018, he was cast as the male lead Wyatt Cole in ABC and M6's 2019 summer crime series Reef Break opposite Poppy Montgomery. Following Reef Break's cancellation, Chiam joined the cast of the Marvel series The Falcon and the Winter Soldier as Dovich.

Following The Falcon and the Winter Soldier, Chiam was cast as Nick Zhao in With Love, Amazon’s one-hour romantic comedy series from Gloria Calderón Kellett and her GloNation Studios and Amazon Studios. Chiam has also made a foray into the world of voice acting and can be heard as the English voice of Werewolf Cookie in popular game Cookie Run Kingdom.

Desmond will be seen alongside Chris Pang, Alexander Hodge, Sherry Austria, Stephanie Hsu, Ashley Park and Sabrina Wu in Adele Lim's upcoming directorial debut. He is also slated to be seen in Netflix's adaptation of Partner Track featuring Arden Cho.

Personal life

Chiam was CLEO Singapore's Bachelor of the Year in 2011.

He resides in Los Angeles with his wife.

Filmography

References

External links 

Desmond Chiam on Instagram

Male actors from Melbourne
Australian people of Singaporean descent
Australian male television actors
Australian people of Chinese descent
Australian male film actors
21st-century Australian male actors
Living people
Male actors of Chinese descent
Year of birth missing (living people)